"Got 2 Luv U" is the first single from Jamaican recording artist Sean Paul's fifth studio album Tomahawk Technique. The song features vocals from American singer Alexis Jordan. It was released on 19 July 2011 by Atlantic Records. The song was featured in 2012 film Magic Mike.

Song information 
Sean Paul co-wrote the song with OneRepublic lead singer Ryan Tedder and Norwegian production duo Stargate. Production was also handled by Stargate. Tedder originally wrote and recorded the song as a break-up song called "Not To Love You" (uploads of this version can be found on YouTube). However, when it was given to Sean Paul and Alexis Jordan, the song was changed into a love song. The "N" in "Not" was changed to a "G" to make the word "Got", thus creating its current title. Also, Paul wrote and recorded two new verses to replace Tedder's original first two verses, while Jordan sings Tedder's original chorus and third verse with different lyrics.

Music video 
The video was filmed on 29 August 2011 at the Hard Rock Cafe in Las Vegas and the Vanity Nightclub that is under the same ownership as the Hard Rock Cafe hotel. The music video was uploaded to YouTube on 15 September 2011 at a total length of three minutes and thirty-four seconds. It was directed by Ben Mor. As of July 2021 the music video has over 407 Million Views.

Track listing 
Digital download
 "Got 2 Luv U" – 3:16

German CD single
 "Got 2 Luv U" – 3:16
 "Ready Fi Dis" (bonus track) – 2:44

Charts

Weekly charts

Year-end charts

Certifications

Release history

References

External links 
 

2011 singles
Sean Paul songs
Songs written by Tor Erik Hermansen
Songs written by Mikkel Storleer Eriksen
Songs written by Ryan Tedder
Songs written by Sean Paul
Song recordings produced by Stargate (record producers)
Number-one singles in Switzerland
Reggae fusion songs
Atlantic Records singles